Nancy Greene Provincial Park is a provincial park in British Columbia, Canada, located approximately  northwest of the city of Rossland and  west of the city of Castlegar in that province's West Kootenay region, at the junction of Highway 3 and Highway 3B. It is named for Nancy Greene, Canadian Olympic medallist in downhill skiing, who is a native of Rossland.

The park offers camping, canoeing, fishing, swimming, and cross-country skiing, as well as a short hiking trail. Nancy Greene has 10 parking lot style sites. The large parking lot allows open parking and can accommodate extra vehicles or larger rigs. There is one walk-in tent site located just above the beach area.

Grizzly bears routinely frequent the park in the spring to feed on vegetation. Pets/domestic animals must be on a leash at all times and are not allowed in beach areas or park buildings. Power boats are prohibited.

See also
List of British Columbia Provincial Parks
List of Canadian provincial parks

References

External links
Nancy Greene Provincial Park website (BC Parks)

Provincial parks of British Columbia
West Kootenay
Monashee Mountains
1972 establishments in British Columbia
Protected areas established in 1972